RXNT (originally Networking Technology, Inc.) is an American privately held healthcare software technology company. The company provides ambulatory practices, hospitals, medical billers, and other healthcare professionals with digital health tools. The company was created in 1999 as a standalone e-prescribing system.

History
Founded in 1999 in Maryland by Randy Boldyga (as Networking Technology Inc.), RXNT initially operated out of a basement to "keep our overhead expenses low" before moving to its first headquarters in 2006. The company has been headquartered in Annapolis, MD since its incorporation on May 27, 1999 and in October 2000, RXNT began beta testing its flagship electronic prescription system with pharmacies and prescribers in the surrounding area.

In December 2003, RXNT received $150,000 in funding from the Anne Arundel County Economic Development Corporation's "Arundel Business Loan Fund" to expand the business.

In 2004, RXNT acquired the user base and technology of Script-Fast Inc, a prescription processing system located in Harrisburg, Pennsylvania.

In November 2007, RXNT was nominated for and received the Anne Arundel Tech Council's "Innovator Award" at the annual TechAwards.

In 2009, RXNT was the first product certified in the "CCHIT Certified 2011 Comprehensive" program for stand-alone electronic prescribing (ePrescribing), and in 2014, RXNT launched the first EPCS-Certified E-Prescribing mobile application for Android devices. In 2017, RXNT EHR 7.2 achieved the 2015 Edition certification from the Drummond Group, a testing and compliance organization for the Office of the National Coordinator for Health Information Technology (ONC) Authorized Certification Body.

Software
RXNT develops, supports, and sells proprietary healthcare software applications with the software-as-a-service (SaaS) model for healthcare professionals and organizations, including Electronic Health Records, Practice management, Patient Scheduling, Medical Billing, Electronic Prescribing, medical Revenue cycle management, and Patient portal.

The e-prescribing system provides information about allergies and potential drug interactions, and medication history.

Partnerships
RXNT partnered with RxHub LLC in 2002, one of the first electronic Health information exchanges (HIE) in the United States. When Surescripts, operator of the Pharmacy Health Information Exchange, formed the Prescriber Vendor Advisory Council in 2007, COO Mark Wiggins was one of ten executives on the advisory council. After RxHub merged with Surescripts in 2008, RXNT was granted Surescripts Platinum Solution Provider status alongside NextGen EHR.

In February 2003, RXNT partnered with Medysis to provide pharmacies with application service provider (ASP) access to electronic prescriptions. 

OhioHealth chose RXNT to provide electronic prescription services for its 2,300 member physicians in 2007.

In 2008, RXNT partnered with Medco to offer free e-prescribing training and software during a pilot program of 500 physicians studying the impact of e-prescribing on patient safety, generic drug use, and formulary compliance of the Medicare population.

References

External links 

Software companies of the United States
Electronic health record software companies
Software companies based in Maryland
Health care companies based in Maryland
Privately held companies based in Maryland